The men's 110 metres hurdles event at the 1988 World Junior Championships in Athletics was held in Sudbury, Ontario, Canada, at Laurentian University Stadium on 29 and 30 July.  106.7 cm (3'6) (senior implement) hurdles were used.

Medalists

Results

Final
30 July
Wind: +3.0 m/s

Semifinals
30 July

Semifinal 1

Wind: +2.4 m/s

Semifinal 2

Wind: +1.6 m/s

Heats
29 July

Heat 1

Wind: +4.4 m/s

Heat 2

Wind: +2.5 m/s

Heat 3

Wind: +1.8 m/s

Heat 4

Wind: +2.6 m/s

Participation
According to an unofficial count, 25 athletes from 20 countries participated in the event.

References

110 metres hurdles
Sprint hurdles at the World Athletics U20 Championships